"Boomerang" is the debut official single by American recording artist JoJo Siwa. "Boomerang" was written by Griffith Frank, Heather Miley, Jordan Richman, and Siwa. Jordan Richman produced the record with Heather Miley as co-producer. The song was released as a digital single on May 6, 2016.

Musical style and lyrics 
"Boomerang" is an upbeat song that deals with the issue of cyberbullying or normal bullying. The song's message is to achieve a triumph over bullies everywhere. Siwa clarifies, "there are two ways to deal with bullies. Bully them back, or tell them politely what they're doing wrong."

Music video 
The music video directed by Monseé Wood was released on May 17, 2016. As of September 9, 2020, the music video had been viewed on YouTube over 910 million times. The video features Jessalyn Siwa (her mother) and the former Dance Moms cast; Sydney and Halle, Siwa’s friends from the show played her BFFs in the video. Kendall, another dancer from the show, played the lead mean girl. Jill, Kendall’s mother, played the teacher in the video. As of July 2022, it has over 5 million likes and 1 million dislikes.

Commercial performance 
On February 24, 2017, the single was certified Gold by the Recording Industry Association of America (RIAA). On August 31, 2017, the song was certified Platinum by the RIAA.

Certifications

References 

2016 songs
Songs about bullying
Works about cyberbullying
JoJo Siwa songs